Fuget is an extinct town in Mississippi County, in the U.S. state of Missouri. The GNIS classifies it as a populated place.

A post office called Fuget was established in 1885, and remained in operation until 1932. The community has the name of Jim Fuget, the proprietor of a local mill.

References

Ghost towns in Missouri
Former populated places in Mississippi County, Missouri